"Reelin' In the Years" (sometimes titled "Reeling In the Years") is a song by American rock band Steely Dan, released as the second single from the band's debut album, Can't Buy a Thrill (1972). It reached No. 11 in the Billboard Hot 100 chart.

Writing and performance
The song was written by Donald Fagen and Walter Becker and features Fagen on vocals. In 2009, Rolling Stone described the track as "a prime early example of what would become the Dan's trademark vibe, marrying a sardonic kiss-off to an ex to a bouncy shuffle groove, and adding on some white-hot guitar dazzlement courtesy of Elliott Randall to bring the whole thing home." In the same interview, Fagen said "It's dumb but effective," and Becker said "It's no fun."

Guitar solo
The guitar solo on the original recorded version, by session player Elliott Randall, was recorded in one take. It has reportedly been rated by Led Zeppelin guitarist Jimmy Page as his favorite solo of all time, and he scored it 12/10. In 2016 the solo was ranked the 40th best guitar solo of all time by the readers of Guitar World magazine.

The four-channel quadraphonic mix of the recording has extra lead guitar fills not heard in the more common two-channel stereo version.

Reception
On its release in 1973, Billboard said: "Easy sounding guitar solos lead into an easy sounding piano break which supports the voices extolling about culling life's experiences from tears to time." Cash Box called it a "winner highlighted by some expert guitar playing."

The song was a No. 11 hit on the Billboard Singles Chart in May 1973. In March 2005, Q magazine placed the recording at No. 95 in its list of the 100 Greatest Guitar Tracks.

Charts

Weekly charts

Year-end charts

Certifications

Personnel

Steely Dan 
 Donald Fagen – piano, lead and backing vocals
 Denny Dias – rhythm guitar
 Walter Becker – bass
 Jim Hodder – drums

Additional personnel 
 Elliott Randall – lead guitar
 Jeff Baxter – rhythm guitar
 Victor Feldman – percussion

References

External links
 Music Notes Entry

1972 songs
1973 singles
Television drama theme songs
Music television series theme songs
Steely Dan songs
Songs written by Donald Fagen
Songs written by Walter Becker
Song recordings produced by Gary Katz
ABC Records singles